Michael G. Tobash (born July 17, 1964) is a politician from the U.S. state of Pennsylvania. He is a member of the Republican Party and is a former member of the Pennsylvania House of Representatives for the 125th district. He was elected on November 2, 2010. Tobash announced he would not seek re-election in 2020. Republican Joseph Kerwin of Lykens ran unopposed in the General Election and was elected to fill the vacant seat on November 3, 2020.

Tobash is a graduate of Elizabethtown College.

References

External links
State Representative Mike Tobash official caucus site
Mike Tobash (R) official PA House site
Mike Tobash for State Representative official campaign site

Living people
1964 births
21st-century American politicians
Elizabethtown College alumni
Republican Party members of the Pennsylvania House of Representatives
People from Schuylkill Haven, Pennsylvania